X Videos (also designated as X-videos) is a 2018 Indian Tamil cyber crime thriller drama film directed by Sajo Sundar, which is also his directorial debut. Inspired by the real life hidden-cam pornography cases, the film depicts social awareness and cautions against such dirty works. It was released on 1 June 2018 in Tamil. Based on its content and subject, the film was given an A certificate.

Production
This movie is the first production of Colour Shadows Entertainment and this production unit is a result of like minded friends coming together, to produce social awareness films and handle controversial subjects. The film was shot in Tamil and Hindi simultaneously.

Conception
The film's idea was conceived by the director Sajo Sundar when one day he found a video clip on the internet which featured his close friend's wife fully naked. Shocked by this incident he further researched about the world of hidden camera pornography and discovered that there were many more of such cases, sometimes that had led to the suicide of the affected person. He decided to direct a social awareness movie which would warn men and women about the risk of saving their personal videos on their mobiles. He wanted to reveal the mafia behind such crimes and how they made money in crores by doing so.

Plot
Manoj a journalist sets on to find out an answer for the question "Is there any use of Porn industry to the Country? Manoj tries to find out the opinion of the common people on Porn websites,he  ends up in a big jolt and shock about his findings.  In this research, he happens to see his friend Ankith wife's naked video on a pornographic website. When Manoj shares this information, Ankith kills himself in shame. Manoj begins his secret investigation, on how could a personal video get posted online. Along with Daniel, his fellow journalist and his buddy Sub-Inspector Imran he gets deep into this. In this investigation, they find out it was Vikram and his associates who operate the porn websites and their various ways and means of collecting the videos. Though Manoj writes about Vikram in his magazine with proper evidence, Vikram escapes with an anticipatory bail. How Manoj and Imran traps Vikarm and does Vikram and his associates get caught and brought to justice forms the rest of the story.

Marketing
Poster of the film was revealed in October 2017 and its trailer was released on 11 May 2018 on YouTube.

Reception
The film was well-received for its clean content, loud and clear concept. And also noted for the director's bold initiative of having a crew of new faces who has handled complex scenes with ease. This movie definitely achieved success to warn and alert those who have the habit of taking, watching or saving nude/personal videos on their cell phones and computers.

References

Indian multilingual films
2010s Tamil-language films
2010s Hindi-language films
2018 films
Films about pornography
Awareness activism
2018 multilingual films
2018 directorial debut films